Crime in Saint Lucia has become a major problem. It is investigated by the Royal Saint Lucia Police Force.

Crime by type

Murder 

In 2012, Saint Lucia had a murder rate of 21.6 per 100,000 population. There were a total of 39 murders in Saint Lucia in 2012. In 2017, there were 60 homicides recorded in Saint Lucia.

In January 2014, British citizen Roger Pratt was murdered on his yacht, Magnetic Attraction, while moored off Vieux Fort, St Lucia. His widow, Margaret Pratt, has voiced her concerns repeatedly about delays in bringing four men charged with the murder to trial, and systematic failures that led to forensic evidence from the murder scene being contaminated.

Robbery 
Robbery is an issue in Saint Lucia. In 2014, Saint Lucia was ranked as one of the top 10 most dangerous cruise destinations in the world, reporting instances of sixty nine cruise passengers being robbed at gun point on just two excursions.

On December 14, 2015 an American couple were robbed by two men carrying a kitchen knife and a machete. Despite filing in a report, they have not heard from the police again and it is presumed that the perpetrators are still at large.

In January 2014, a British couple were robbed on board their yacht while it was moored off Vieux Fort, St Lucia, with the husband being murdered.

In 2013, 55 cruise ship passengers were robbed at gunpoint during daylight at the Botanical Gardens in Soufriere. No one was injured during the incident.

Crime dynamics

Policing 
The Saint Lucia police have been accused, largely by prominent figures in the then opposition party (St. Lucia Labour Party),  of keeping death lists and carrying out extrajudicial killings of suspected criminals in an attempt to make St Lucia more attractive to tourists. Alleged shootings by police took place in 2010 and 2011 during a security drive called Operation Restore Confidence, which was aimed at reducing violent crime and boosting tourism. According to an independent report, officers from the Royal St. Lucia Police Force staged a dozen killings of suspected criminals. The police then reported the killings as murders committed by unknown assailants, planting weapons at the scene. In August 2013 the US government suspended assistance to the Saint Lucia police in light of rumors of the extrajudicial killings.

In 2015 the Saint Lucia police stated that they were under-resourced, with not enough police officers to keep up with the crime case load.

References

 
Law of Saint Lucia
Society of Saint Lucia